Baruraj Assembly constituency  is an assembly constituency in Muzaffarpur district in the Indian state of Bihar.

Overview
As per Delimitation of Parliamentary and Assembly constituencies Order, 2008, No. 96 Baruraj Assembly constituency is composed of the following: Motipur community development block; Chochahin Chhapra and Saraiya gram panchayats of Paroo CD Block.

Baruraj Assembly constituency is part of No. 16 Vaishali (Lok Sabha constituency).

Members of Legislative Assembly

Election results

1977-2010
In the 2010 state assembly elections, Brij Kishor Singh of RJD won the Baruraj assembly seat defeating his nearest rival Nand Kumar Rai of JD(U). Contests in most years were multi cornered but only winners and runners up are being mentioned. Shashi Kumar Rai of JD(U) defeated Brij Kishor Singh of RJD in October 2005. Brij Kishor Singh of RJD defeated Shashi Kumar Rai of JD(U) in February 2005. Shashi Kumar Rai of JD(U) defeated Brij Kishor Singh of RJD in 2000. Shashi Kumar Rai of JD defeated  Brij Kumar Singh of BPP in 1995 and Balendra Prasad Singh, Independent, in 1990. Shashi Kumar Rai of LD defeated Jamuna Singh of Congress in 1985. Jamuna Singh of Congress defeated Shashi Kumar Rai of Janata Party (Secular – Charan Singh) in 1980. Balendra Prasad Singh of CPI defeated Shashi Kumar Rai, Independent, in 1977.

2020

References

External links
 

Assembly constituencies of Bihar
Politics of Muzaffarpur district